The Alpine Pass Route is a long-distance hiking trail through the Alps in Switzerland, part of the Via Alpina route. It starts in Sargans in eastern Switzerland, and crosses the heart of country westwards to finish in Montreux on the shore of Lake Geneva.

The route

There are a number of variations on the precise route, but the following stages are fairly standard:
The Via Alpina green trail follows the Swiss National Route no. 1 (previously known as the Swiss Alpine Pass Route from Sargans to Lenk, which then continues over a further four passes to Montreux.

 From Sargans over the Foo Pass to Elm
 Over the Richetli Pass to Linthal
 Over the Klausen Pass to Flüelen
 Over the Surenen Pass to Engelberg
 Over the Joch Pass to Meiringen
 Over the Grosse Scheidegg Pass to Grindelwald
 Over the Kleine Scheidegg Pass to Lauterbrunnen

 Over the Sefinenfurgge Pass to Griesalp
 Over the Hohtürli Pass to Kandersteg
 Over the Bunderchrinde Pass to Adelboden
 Over the Hahnenmoos Pass to Lenk
 Over the Trütlisberg Pass to Lauenen
 Over the Krinne to Gsteig
 Over the Col des Andérets to Col des Mosses
 Over the Col de Chaude to Montreux

The central portion of the route through the Bernese Oberland is the most spectacular, with many hikers choosing to hike a few passes rather than the whole route in one go. The excellent transport connections give many possibilities for breaking it up.

Signposting
The trail is well signposted.  Most of the signs carry the name of the next pass or town, but increasingly the green square "Via Alpina" signs are being introduced. This is now called route number 1.

References

External links
 
 http://www.wanderland.ch/en/routes/route-01.html

Hiking trails in Switzerland